FC Zenit Irkutsk is a defunct Russian football team from Irkutsk. It was founded in 2003 and participated in amateur competitions. Before the 2016–17 season, it was licensed to play in the third-tier Russian Professional Football League after another Irkutsk team, FC Baikal Irkutsk, failed to get a license. On 1 April 2021, the club announced that they will be dissolved due to lack of financing.

From 2010 to 2013, it was called FC Zenit-Rekord Irkutsk.

References

External links
  Official Website 

Association football clubs established in 2003
Association football clubs disestablished in 2021
Defunct football clubs in Russia
Sport in Irkutsk
2003 establishments in Russia
2021 disestablishments in Russia